The 2021 Basketball Champions League (BCL) Final Eight was the 5th Basketball Champions League tournament and the 2nd in the format of Final Eight. It was the concluding phase of the 2020–21 Basketball Champions League season. Due to the COVID-19 pandemic, the usual format of Final Four was changed to Final Eight, same as in the previous season.

San Pablo Burgos won its second consecutive championship.

Venue
The Trade Union Sport Palace hosted the final tournament for the first time.

Teams

Bracket

Quarterfinals

Semifinals

Third place game

Final

Notes

References

External links 
 Basketball Champions League (official website)

2020–21 Basketball Champions League
Basketball Champions League Final Eight